, was an admiral in the Imperial Japanese Navy and twice Prime Minister of Japan from 1913 to 1914 and again from 1923 to 1924.

Biography

Early life
Yamamoto was born in Kagoshima in Satsuma Province (now Kagoshima Prefecture) as the sixth son of a samurai who served as a secretary and sōjutsu master of the Shimazu clan. As a youth, he took part in the Anglo-Satsuma War. He later joined Satsuma's Eighth Rifle Troop in the Boshin War that ended the Tokugawa shogunate, fighting at the Battle of Toba–Fushimi and other locations; he was also aboard one of the ships that pursued Enomoto Takeaki and the remnants of the Tokugawa fleet to Hokkaidō in 1869. After the success of the Meiji Restoration, Yamamoto attended preparatory schools in Tokyo and entered the 2nd class of the Imperial Japanese Naval Academy in 1870. At the time of the Satsuma Rebellion, he briefly returned to Kagoshima, but at the urging of Saigo Takamori, he returned to the Naval Academy before the start of combat.

Naval career

After graduation in 1874, Yamamoto went on a training cruise to Europe and South America aboard Imperial German Navy vessels from 1877 to 1878, and as junior officer acquired much sea experience. He wrote a gunnery manual that became the standard for the Imperial Japanese Navy and served as executive officer of the cruiser  on its shakedown voyage from Elswick to Japan (1885 to 1886). After serving as captain of the corvette , he accompanied Navy Minister Kabayama Sukenori on a trip to the United States and Europe that lasted over a year (1887 to 1888).

As commander of the cruiser , he undertook a confidential mission to meet Qing General Yuan Shikai in Hanseong (Seoul), Korea (1890).

Working under his patron, Navy Minister Saigō Tsugumichi from 1893, Yamamoto became the real leader of the navy; initiating numerous reforms, attempting to end favoritism toward officers of his own Satsuma province, attempting to end officers from profiteering from military office, and attempting to attain roughly equal status with the Army in the Supreme War Council. He also pushed for an aggressive strategy towards the Chinese Empire in the First Sino-Japanese War (1894–95). Yamamoto was promoted to rear admiral in 1895 and to vice admiral in 1898.

As Minister of the Navy

In November 1898, Yamamoto was appointed Navy Minister under the second Yamagata Aritomo administration. By this time, the Russian Empire was already perceived as the greatest threat to Japan, and Yamamoto advised the government that it was possible that Japan would win a conflict against Russia, albeit at the cost of more than half of the Imperial Japanese Navy. He sponsored promising junior officers a "brain trust", including Akiyama Saneyuki and Hirose Takeo, whom he sent as naval attachés to the United States, United Kingdom and Russia to gather intelligence and to make strategic assessments of capabilities. Domestically, he pushed for increased capacity and modernisation of shipyards and steel mills,  and for the increase import of higher quality coal from the United Kingdom to power his warships. Externally, he was a strong supporter of the Anglo-Japanese Alliance. As an indication of the increased independence and prestige of the Navy, Emperor Meiji appeared in naval uniform during a public appearance for the first time. Yamamoto was made baron (danshaku) under the kazoku peerage system in 1902; and he was promoted to the rank of admiral in 1904.

As Minister of the Navy during the Russo-Japanese War, Yamamoto showed strong leadership and was responsible for appointing Tōgō Heihachirō as commander-in-chief of the Combined Fleet.  He gave voice to Tōgō's reports when he read aloud his reports from the war to the assembled Diet.

Yamamoto was replaced as Navy Minister by Saito Makoto in January 1906. He was elevated to count (hakushaku) in 1907.

As Prime Minister

In February 1913, Yamamoto became Prime Minister of Japan in 1913, succeeding Katsura Taro as leader of then Rikken Seiyukai political party. During Yamamoto's first term as the prime minister, he abolished the rule that both the Navy Minister and Army Minister had to be active duty officers. This rule gave the military a stranglehold over the civilian government since the military could withdraw their minister and refuse to appoint a successor. Failure to fill the post would cause the existing cabinet to collapse.  Thus, Yamamoto gained a reputation for being a liberal and a supporter of public claims for democracy and constitutional government. However, his administration was plagued by charges of corruption and he was forced to resign with his entire cabinet in April 1914 to take responsibility for the Siemens-Vickers Naval Armaments scandal, even though it was never proved that he was personally involved.

Under the succeeded Okuma administration, Yamamoto was transferred to naval reserves. During World War I and the subsequent disarmament treaty negotiations, he remained sidelined.

Yamamoto was recalled to government as Prime Minister again on 2 September 1923 in the emergency "earthquake cabinet" caused by the sudden death of Prime Minister Katō Tomosaburō immediately following the Great Kantō earthquake. He showed leadership in the restoration of Tokyo which had been heavily damaged by the earthquake. He also attempted to reform the electoral system to permit universal male suffrage. However, he and his cabinet were forced to resign again in January 1924, this time over the attempt by Namba Daisuke to assassinate Prince Regent Hirohito on 27 December 1923 (the Toranomon Incident).

Subsequently, Yamamoto withdrew from political life completely. Suggestions that he be made one of the Genrō were vehemently opposed by his life-long political enemy, Saionji Kinmochi, who also blocked all efforts for him to have a seat on the Privy Council. In December 1933, nine months after the death of his wife, Yamamoto died of complication due to benign prostatic hyperplasia at his home in Takanawa, Tokyo at the age of 82. His grave is at the Aoyama Cemetery in Tokyo.

Honors

Peerages
Baron (27 February 1902) 
Count (21 September 1907)

Japanese
 1887 –  Order of the Rising Sun, 6th class 
 1895 –  Order of the Rising Sun, 4th class  
 1895 –  Order of the Golden Kite, 4th class  
 1900 –  Order of the Sacred Treasure, 2nd class
 1901 –  Grand Cordon of the Order of the Rising Sun
 1906 –  Order of the Golden Kite, 1st class  
 1906 –  Order of the Rising Sun with Paulownia Flowers
 1928 –  Order of the Chrysanthemum
 1930 –  Grand Cordon of the Order of the Chrysanthemum

Foreign
 1900 –  - Prussia - Order of the Red Eagle, 1st class
 1900 –  - France - Legion of Honour, Grand officier
 1907 –  - France - Legion of Honour, Grand Croix
 1907 –  - Prussia - Order of the Red Eagle, Grand Cross
 1907 –  - UK -  Order of St Michael and St George, Knight Grand Cross (GCMG).

Notes

References

Sources

External links 

London Gazette Issue 28019

1852 births
1933 deaths
20th-century prime ministers of Japan
Imperial Japanese Navy admirals
Kazoku
Boshin War
Knights Grand Cross of the Order of St Michael and St George
Recipients of the Order of the Golden Kite, 1st class
Grand Cordons of the Order of the Rising Sun
Recipients of the Order of the Paulownia Flowers
People from Kagoshima
People from Satsuma Domain
People of Meiji-period Japan
People of the Boshin War
Japanese military personnel of the First Sino-Japanese War
Japanese people of the Russo-Japanese War
Government ministers of Japan
Ministers of the Imperial Japanese Navy
Prime Ministers of Japan
Samurai
Shimazu retainers
Burials in Japan
Imperial Japanese Naval Academy alumni